Enboa Wu from the Hong Kong Applied Science and Technology Research Institute (ASTRI), Co., Ltd., Shatin, Hong Kong, China was named Fellow of the Institute of Electrical and Electronics Engineers (IEEE) in 2012 for contributions to light emitting diode and packaging technologies.

References 

Fellow Members of the IEEE
Living people
Year of birth missing (living people)
Place of birth missing (living people)